Eddie Rampling (born 17 February 1948) is an English footballer, who played as a winger in the Football League for Chester.

References

Chester City F.C. players
Stalybridge Celtic F.C. players
Association football wingers
English Football League players
1948 births
Living people
People from Wigan
English footballers